The 1976 Milan–San Remo was the 67th edition of the Milan–San Remo cycle race and was held on 19 March 1976. The race started in Milan and finished in San Remo. The race was won by Eddy Merckx of the Molteni team.

General classification

Notes

References

1976
1976 in road cycling
1976 in Italian sport
1976 Super Prestige Pernod